The Romanian Socialist Party is a political party in Romania formed as the Socialist Alliance Party (PAS) in 2003. It developed out of the wing of the Socialist Party of Labour (PSM) that objected to the merger of PSM with the Social Democratic Party (PSD) in July 2003 and wanted the PSM to continue as a socialist party. The Romanian authorities did not recognize this group as part of PSM, and instead it took the name Socialist Alliance Party.

After absorbing the United Left Party in 2009, the party merged into the Socialist Alternative Party in late 2013. In late 2014, the merged party changed its name to the Socialist Party of Romania, replacing the party of the same name defunct since 2013. The unregistered present-day Romanian Communist Party (PCR; which has since gained registration after changing its name to the Communitarian Party of Romania) had argued that the PSR is a pseudo-communist party.

The then-PAS decided to rename itself the Romanian Communist Party at an extraordinary party congress in July 2010, placing itself in the tradition of the party of the same name founded in 1921. The renaming was however rejected by the Bucharest tribunal.

In 2013, it won 34 local seats. The party is led by a 165-member National Committee, a 60-member Directive Committee and a 60-member Executive Bureau. PSR was a founding member of the Party of the European Left.

Ideology
Unlike its predecessor - the Socialist Party of Labour, the Romanian Socialist Party is more progressive on social issues, supporting socialist feminism. However, much like its predecessor, it is nationalist and supports Communism nostalgia.

The Party supports Romanian membership in the European Union, and even calls for European federalism. However, it strongly rejects the Romanian membership in NATO.

Electoral history

Legislative elections

Local elections

Presidential elections

European elections

See also
Communitarian Party of Romania
Democracy and Solidarity Party

References

External links
Party website

2003 establishments in Romania
Communist parties in Romania
European federalist parties
Feminism in Romania
Feminist parties in Europe
International Meeting of Communist and Workers Parties
Left-wing nationalist parties
Left-wing parties in Romania
Nationalist parties in Romania
Organizations based in Bucharest
Party of the European Left member parties
Political parties established in 2003
Pro-European political parties in Romania
Registered political parties in Romania
Socialist feminist organizations
Socialist parties in Romania